George Porter, Baron Porter of Luddenham,  (6 December 1920 – 31 August 2002) was a British chemist. He was awarded the Nobel Prize in Chemistry in 1967.

Education and early life
Porter was born in Stainforth, near Thorne, in the then West Riding of Yorkshire. He was educated at Thorne Grammar School, then won a scholarship to the University of Leeds and gained his first degree in chemistry.  During his degree, Porter was taught by Meredith Gwynne Evans, who he later said was the most brilliant chemist he had ever met. He was awarded a PhD from the University of Cambridge in 1949 for research investigating free radicals produced by photochemical means. He would later become a fellow at Emmanuel College, Cambridge.

Career and research
Porter served in the Royal Naval Volunteer Reserve during the Second World War. Porter then went on to do research at the University of Cambridge supervised by Ronald George Wreyford Norrish where he began the work that ultimately led to them becoming Nobel Laureates.

His original research in developing the technique of flash photolysis to obtain information on short-lived molecular species provided the first evidence of free radicals. His later research utilised the technique to study the detailed aspects of the light-dependent reactions of photosynthesis, with particular regard to possible applications to a hydrogen economy, of which he was a strong advocate.

He was Assistant Director of the British Rayon Research Association from 1953 to 1954, where he studied the phototendering of dyed cellulose fabrics in sunlight.

Porter served as professor in the Chemistry department at the University of Sheffield in 1954–65. It was here he started his work on flash photolysis with equipment designed and made in the departmental workshop. During this tenure he also took part in a television programme describing his work. This was in the "Eye on Research" series.  Porter became Fullerian Professor of Chemistry and Director of the Royal Institution in 1966. During his directorship of the Royal Institution, Porter was instrumental in the setting up of Applied Photophysics, a company created to supply instrumentation based on his group's work.  He was awarded the Nobel Prize in Chemistry in 1967 along with Manfred Eigen and Ronald George Wreyford Norrish. In the same year he became a visiting professor at University College London.

Porter was a major contributor to the Public Understanding of science. He became president of the British Association in 1985 and was the founding Chair of the Committee on the Public Understanding of Science (COPUS). He gave the Romanes Lecture, entitled "Science and the human purpose", at the University of Oxford in 1978; and in 1988 he gave the Dimbleby Lecture, "Knowledge itself is power." From 1990 to 1993 he gave the Gresham lectures in astronomy.

Awards and honours
Porter was elected a Fellow of the Royal Society (FRS) in 1960, a member of the American Academy of Arts and Sciences in 1979, a member of the American Philosophical Society in 1986, and served as President of the Royal Society from 1985 to 1990. He was also awarded the Davy Medal in 1971, the Rumford Medal in 1978, the Ellison-Cliffe Medal in 1991 and the Copley Medal in 1992.

Porter also received an Honorary Doctorate from Heriot-Watt University in 1971.

He was knighted in 1972, appointed to the Order of Merit in 1989, and was made a life peer as Baron Porter of Luddenham, of Luddenham in the County of Kent, in 1990. In 1995, he was awarded an Honorary Degree (Doctor of Laws) from the University of Bath.

In 1976 he gave the Royal Institution Christmas Lecture on The Natural History of a Sunbeam.

Porter served as Chancellor of the University of Leicester between 1984 and 1995. In 2001, the university's chemistry building was named the George Porter Building in his honour.

Family

In 1949 Porter married Stella Jean Brooke.

Publications

Chemistry for the Modern World (1962)
Chemistry in Microtime (1996)

See also
 List of presidents of the Royal Society

References

External links

 
 Profile – Royal Institution of Great Britain
 The Life and Scientific Legacy of George Porter, World Scientific Publishing, 2006
 Obituary in The Guardian, 3 September 2002
 Biographical Database of the British Chemical Community, 1880–1970
 "The Relevance of Science". George Porter. JASA (Journal of the American Scientific Affiliation) Vol. 28. March 1976. pp. 2–3.(Includes editorial responses from astronomer Owen Gingerich and theologian Bernard Ramm amongst others.)
 

1920 births
2002 deaths
Chemists at the University of Cambridge
Academics of the University of Sheffield
Academics of University College London
Alumni of Emmanuel College, Cambridge
Alumni of the University of Leeds
British humanists
Crossbench life peers
Fellows of the Royal Society
Kalinga Prize recipients
Knights Bachelor
Members of the Order of Merit
Members of the Pontifical Academy of Sciences
Foreign associates of the National Academy of Sciences
Foreign Members of the USSR Academy of Sciences
Foreign Members of the Russian Academy of Sciences
Foreign Fellows of the Indian National Science Academy
Nobel laureates in Chemistry
British Nobel laureates
People associated with the University of Leicester
People from Stainforth, South Yorkshire
English physical chemists
Presidents of the Royal Society
Directors of the Royal Institution
Recipients of the Copley Medal
Faraday Lecturers
Presidents of the British Science Association
English Nobel laureates
People educated at Thorne Grammar School
Photochemists
Royal Naval Volunteer Reserve personnel of World War II
Members of the American Philosophical Society
Life peers created by Elizabeth II